Elizabeth Marshall was a cook who ran a patisserie and cookery school in Newcastle upon Tyne between 1770 and about 1790. She is the author of The Young Ladies' Guide in the Art of Cookery, subtitled being a Collection of useful Receipts, Published for the Convenience of the Ladies committed to her Care, by Eliz. Marshall. Her Art of Cookery was printed by Thomas Saint, printer of wood engravings by Thomas Bewick as well as the printer and publisher of the Newcastle Courant, a forerunner of The Journal and the Evening Chronicle.

Marshall was born in Swarland or Felton, Northumberland in 1738 and was christened in St. Michael & All Angels Church on 15 February that year. Her cookery school occupied premises in Mosley Street, Newcastle upon Tyne, and census records show her moving to a neighbouring shop where she paid £10 3s 6d in rateable value. Saint's printing press was also located in Mosley Street.

The Art of Cookery is notable for its inclusion of recipes requiring expensive imported ingredients such as truffles, morels, pineapples and lemons, which Marshall used in large quantities: her recipe for The Power of Lemons, a concentrated lemon essence, begins with the words Take 100 Lemons. This recipe, which implies knowledge of the properties of lemons in preventing scurvy, does not appear in any of the other cookery books from the 18th century.

Her book is exceptional in using truffles, which were not standard fare for the late 18th century. Only  Patrick Lamb in 1710 and Alexis Soyer in 1846 included truffles in their recipes. Jean Anthelme Brillat-Savarin wrote in 1815 that truffles were found only on the tables of the very wealthy or that of the mistress of a wealthy man.

The book throws light on 18th century cooking practices. For example, Marshall advocated removing salt from butter by washing it in Rose water, making it more palatable for the cheesecakes, puddings and sweet pastries she taught her pupils to prepare. She also used the technique of using a feather to clear the seeds from jellies. This method is still used today for Bar-le-duc jelly.

Contents

Preface

To the YOUNG LADIES who have done me the Honour of attending my School.

LADIES,

It is at your urgent and frequently repeated request that the following Receipts have at length come abroad. – You were sensible of the necessity of having an assistance of this sort to your memory; and the difficulty as well as expense of procuring the Receipts in manuscript, suggested the present form as the most proper and convenient for answering your intentions. – I hope this will be considered as a sufficient apology for the design. For its execution I have less to say. – The subject does not admit of elegance of expression, though I acknowledge the language might have been more correct. It was my wish to have rendered it so, but the various other duties in which I am engaged, would not allow me leisure sufficient for the purpose. – Such as the work is, I hope it will be received with candour, and consulted with advantage.

I am,

LADIES,

With much Respect

Your most obliged Servant,

E. MARSHALL	

LOW BRIDGE,

Newcastle.

Chapter headings

The book comprises chapters on cakes, puddings, pies, pickles, preserves, creams and custards, fish and seafood (including salmon, lobster and oysters), meat (including veal, beef tenderloin and venison), soups, sauces, poultry (including chicken, goose, turkey and partridge), and wines and essences. It also contains an index.

Releves/Bills of fare

Menu suggestions are included, with diagrams showing how the dishes should be arranged on the table.

References 

W. Carew Hazlitt's Old Cookery Books.

WorldCat 

Oxford Companion to Food  

Waitrose Online: Old Flames - British cooks and cookery writers of great repute

External links 
 Saint Michael and All Angels Church, Felton

English food writers
English chefs
English women non-fiction writers
1738 births
Year of death missing
Women food writers
Women cookbook writers
History of British cuisine